Bringmann is a German surname. Notable people with the surname include:

Kathrin Bringmann (born 1977), German number theorist 
Klaus Bringmann (born 1936), German historian, author, and professor
Steffen Bringmann (born 1964), East German sprinter

German-language surnames